Arthur Thomas Abraham Pattinson (13 May 1880 – 27 June 1964) was an Australian rules footballer who played for the St Kilda Football Club in the Victorian Football League (VFL).

Notes

External links 

1880 births
1964 deaths
Australian rules footballers from Victoria (Australia)
St Kilda Football Club players